August Friedrich Christian Schmierer (born 28 April 1870, date of death unknown) was a German rugby union player who competed in the 1900 Summer Olympics.

He was a member of the German rugby union team, which won the silver medal. Germany was represented at the tournament mainly by the FC 1880 Frankfurt rather than an official national team. Schmierer had left Frankfurt in 1897 and was in 1900 already chairman of the Cannstatter Fußball-Club. But he was invited to the olympic tournament by his former club.

References

External links

 

1870 births
Year of death missing
German rugby union players
Rugby union players at the 1900 Summer Olympics
Olympic rugby union players of Germany
Olympic silver medalists for Germany
SC 1880 Frankfurt players
Rugby union scrum-halves
Medalists at the 1900 Summer Olympics
Sportspeople from Stuttgart
Place of death missing